First Reformed Church, also known as the First Reformed United Church of Christ, is a historic Reformed church located at 22 E. Center Street in Lexington, Davidson County, North Carolina.  It was designed by architect Herbert B. Hunter and built in 1927–1928.  It is a steel frame building sheathed in tapestry brick, with a Late Gothic Revival style interior.  It features a pair of corner towers of uneven height, pointed-arched portal, and a stone and stained glass rose window.

It was added to the National Register of Historic Places in 2000.

See also
 National Register of Historic Places listings in Davidson County, North Carolina

References

External links

First Reformed UCC Church website

United Church of Christ churches in North Carolina
Churches in Davidson County, North Carolina
Churches on the National Register of Historic Places in North Carolina
Gothic Revival church buildings in North Carolina
Churches completed in 1927
20th-century United Church of Christ church buildings
National Register of Historic Places in Davidson County, North Carolina